Langtang North is a Local Government Area in Plateau State, Nigeria.

It has an area of 1,188 km and a population of 140,643 at the 2006 census.
 
The postal code of the area is 941.

History 
In July 2014, "at least 11 persons have been feared killed at Zamadede of Pil-Gani district of Langtang North Local Government Area of Plateau State." House of Representatives member Hon. Beni Lar, who represents Langtang North and South constituency, "described the Zama Dede community as peace loving and hard working farmers," who are good in produce large/quantity of crops. "She wondered why some people would be so cruel to take the lives of innocent citizens, particularly at the time the federal government, through the national conference, was trying to find a lasting solution to clashes between farmers and herdsmen," and "appealed to the people of her constituents to remain law abiding."

References

Local Government Areas in Plateau State